Californiae can refer to:
The Californias
Archytas californiae
Stenopogon californiae
Psilochorus californiae
Leptarctia californiae
Glyphipterix californiae
Lampropeltis californiae